Lutheran High School is a private Lutheran high school located in Parker, Colorado, in the United States. Affiliated with the Lutheran Church–Missouri Synod, the school is accredited by the National Lutheran School Association and has an average class size of 25 students. The executive director of the school is Dan Gehrke.

History 
In 1955, Lutheran High School opened on West Arizona Avenue in Denver, Colorado. Only temporary buildings, including a little, white house, which is still on campus today, served as the classrooms and school library. Total enrollment the first year was 77 students - 49 freshmen and 28 sophomores. Students voted to have navy blue and gold as the school colors and The Lights as the mascot.  In 2000, the school decided to expand to two additional campuses - Lutheran High School of the Rockies (later renamed Lutheran High School Parker) and North Lutheran High School. Lutheran High was renamed Denver Lutheran because of the additional campuses.

Lutheran High School Parker opened in 2000 in a strip mall on Parker Road. In 2004, construction for Lutheran High School Parker started at its current location on Newlin Gulch. Construction was completed in 2008. Enrollment goals for each campus could not be met for several years, resulting in North Lutheran High closing in 2006. The lack of success also resulted in Denver Lutheran closing its doors in 2011 and being consolidated Lutheran High School Parker, with the consolidated school being named Lutheran High School. Lutheran High School is now the only Lutheran high school in the Denver metro area. , enrollment was 600.

Athletics - state championships 
The school has won the following state championships:
 Cross Country – 1975
 Girls Basketball - 1985, 1996, 1998, 2014, 2016 
 Boys Basketball – 1985, 1986, 2011, 2021
 Boys Track - 1989, 2014, 2015, 2016, 2017, 2019
 Poms – 2010
 Volleyball - 2011, 2012, 2018

Notable alumni 
 Jon Scott (Class of 1976) - Fox News anchor (Fox & Friends)

References

High schools in Denver
Lutheran schools in Colorado
Private high schools in Colorado
Secondary schools affiliated with the Lutheran Church–Missouri Synod
1955 establishments in Colorado
Educational institutions established in 1955